An extensive network of trails in Lincoln, Nebraska are available for recreation there.

The Antelope Valley Project provides a hub for the system. Project trails parallel the new Antelope Valley Parkway and provide connections to other trails. Capitol Parkway and its trail network connect to the Antelope Valley Project at J Street. Other trails utilize abandoned railroad rights of way. Some trails have been specially constructed. Still others, run through Wilderness Park—miles of more primitive recreational trails exist there.

Major trails

Antelope Valley Parkway 
This extensive transportation, flood control and park complex, is the new hub of Lincoln's trails. A trail lines the Antelope Creek flood control channel from Military Road on the north to an extension connection of the Billy Wolff Trail on the South. The Parkway trails and connections to other trails, are made possible by a series of underpasses and bridges. The MoPac Trail intersects the Antelope Valley Project trail between W and Y Streets. The Jamaica North Trail is another of several convenient trails connected through the project.

Holmes Lake Trail 
Virtually surrounding Holmes Lake, the trail connects with the Billy Wolff Trail south. The resulting trail complex, runs Northeast to the University of Nebraska-Lincoln, City Campus.

Billy Wolff Trail 
The trail runs from Holmes Lake, along Antelope Creek and Capitol Parkway, to the University of Nebraska-Lincoln campus. In 2010, the intersection of South Street and Capitol Parkway will be revised to provide a pathway uninterrupted by streets continuing on and connecting to the Antelope Valley Parkway hub for the city network of trails.

Rock Island Trail 
Connected to the Bill Wolff Trail, the Rock Island Trail extends from Antelope Park, South to Wilderness Park. Through a series of underpasses and bridges, e.g. Highway 2 and South 14th bridges, the trail runs virtually uninterrupted by streets and highways. There is a crossing at Calvert Street (little auto traffic), another on Essex Road (even less auto traffic), and finally a crossing at Old Cheney Road (pretty busy), near 14th Street.

Jamaica North Trail 

The Jamaica North Trail uses  of abandoned Union Pacific Rail track. This trail runs through southwest Lincoln neighborhoods, connects to the Homestead Trail, to the Haymarket and provides access to the UNL City Campus. Eventually the Homestead trail will leave the Haymarket and connect to Marysville, KS,  to the South.

Other trails 
Additional trails include: Murdock Trail, John Dietrich Trail, MoPac Trail, Boosalis Trail, Superior St. Trail, Roper West Park Trail, Wilderness Park Trails, Bison Trail, Levee Trail, Antelope Creek Trail and Homestead Trail.

See also 

 Antelope Valley Conservancy

External links
Lincoln trail maps

Geography of Lincoln, Nebraska
Protected areas of Lancaster County, Nebraska
Tourist attractions in Lincoln, Nebraska